Janari Jõesaar (born 8 December 1993) is an Estonian professional basketball player for Anwil Włocławek of the Polish Basketball League. He is a 1.98 m (6 ft 6 in) tall small forward. He played college basketball for the Ole Miss Rebels and the Texas–Pan American Broncs.

College career
In his sophomore season, Jõesaar earned second-team All-WAC honors after leading Texas–Pan American in scoring with 16.9 points per game.

Professional career
In 2015, Jõesaar joined Rapla during the preseason, but left after making just three appearances in the Estonian Basketball Cup. On 27 October 2015, he joined Rakvere Tarvas. 

On 24 February 2019 Jõesaar signed a 1.5-year contract with Liga ACB team Iberostar Tenerife. 

In June 2020 he signed a 2-year contract with Baxi Manresa.

On June 16, 2021, he has signed with Medi Bayreuth of the Basketball Bundesliga.

On July 22, 2022, he has signed with Anwil Włocławek of the Polish Basketball League.

National team career 
Jõesaar has represented the Estonian national team since 2014. He represented Estonia in the 2015 Summer Universiade in Gwangju, finishing in eighth place.

Career statistics

College

|-
| style="text-align:left;"| 2013–14
| style="text-align:left;"| Ole Miss
| 12 || 0 || 4.3 || .474 || .250 || .800 || 1.5 || .1 || .3 || .0 || 2.3
|-
| style="text-align:left;"| 2014–15
| style="text-align:left;"| Texas–Pan American
| 31 || 31 || 34.0 || .460 || .378 || .817 || 6.6 || 2.4 || 1.3 || .6 || 16.9
|- class="sortbottom"
| style="text-align:center;" colspan="2"| Career
| 43 || 31 || 25.7 || .461 || .372 || .816 || 5.2 || 1.8 || 1.0 || .4 || 12.8

Domestic leagues

Estonia national team

|-
| style="text-align:left;"|  2010
| style="text-align:left;"| 2010 U-18 European Championship Division B
| style="text-align:left;"| Estonia U-18
| 8 || 8 || 31.5 || .465 || .200 || .684 || 8.3 || .8 || 1.3 || .6 || 12.3
|-
| style="text-align:left;"|  2011
| style="text-align:left;"| 2011 U-18 European Championship Division B
| style="text-align:left;"| Estonia U-18
| 7 || 7 || 29.3 || .459 || .222 || .609 || 6.7 || 1.7 || 2.0 || .6 || 12.3
|-
| style="text-align:left;"|  2015
| style="text-align:left;"| 2015 Summer Universiade
| style="text-align:left;"| Estonia Universiade
| 7 || 4 || 22.0 || .417 || .385 || .615 || 5.0 || 1.3 || 1.4 || .1 || 11.6
|-
| style="text-align:left;"|  2017
| style="text-align:left;"| 2019 Basketball World Cup Pre-Qualifiers
| style="text-align:left;"| Estonia
| 1 || 0 || 17.0 || .500 || .333 || 1.000 || 3.0 || .0 || .0 || .0 || 13.0
|-
| style="text-align:left;"|  2018–19
| style="text-align:left;"| 2019 Basketball World Cup Qualification
| style="text-align:left;"| Estonia
| 5 || 3 || 21.2 || .478 || .143 || .500 || 5.4 || 1.6 || 1.4 || .8 || 5.2
|-
| style="text-align:left;"| 2020–21
| style="text-align:left;"| EuroBasket 2022 qualification
| style="text-align:left;"| Estonia
| 6 || 6 || 28.4 || .417 || .333 || .733 || 4.3 || 2.2 || 1.2 || .3 || 7.7

References

External links
Janari Jõesaar at basket.ee
Janari Jõesaar at fiba.com

1993 births
Living people
Bàsquet Manresa players
BC Kalev/Cramo players
BC Rakvere Tarvas players
CB Canarias players
Estonian expatriate basketball people in Germany
Estonian expatriate basketball people in Poland
Estonian expatriate basketball people in Spain
Estonian expatriate basketball people in the United States
Estonian men's basketball players
KK Włocławek players
Korvpalli Meistriliiga players
Liga ACB players
Medi Bayreuth players
Ole Miss Rebels men's basketball players
Rapla KK players
Small forwards
University of Tartu basketball team players
Texas–Pan American Broncs men's basketball players